Abachikkanahalli is a village in the southern state of Karnataka, India. It is located in the Devanahalli taluk of Bangalore Rural district.

Demographics 
According to the 2011 census Abachikkanahalli had a population of 47 of which 24 were male and 23 female.

See also 
 Bangalore Rural
 Districts of Karnataka

References

External links 
 https://bangalorerural.nic.in/en/

Villages in Bangalore Rural district